The 2015 Newcastle Knights season was the 28th in the club's history. Coached by Rick Stone, interim coached by Danny Buderus after Stone's contract was terminated, and captained by Kurt Gidley, they competed in the NRL's 2015 Telstra Premiership, finishing the regular season in 16th place (out of 16).

Milestones
Round 1: James McManus played his 150th for the club, which was also his 150th career game.
Round 1: Tyler Randell scored his 1st career try and kicked his 1st career goal.
Round 1: Beau Scott captained his 1st game for the club.
Round 1: Jack Stockwell made his debut for the club, after previously playing for the St. George Illawarra Dragons.
Round 2: Akuila Uate scored his 57th try at Hunter Stadium, breaking Adam MacDougall's record of 56 tries as the highest ever try-scorer at Hunter Stadium.
Round 3: Chris Houston scored his 100th point for the club, which was also his 100th career point.
Round 5: Tariq Sims made his debut for the club, after previously playing for the North Queensland Cowboys.
Round 6: Akuila Uate scored his 100th career try, which was also his 100th for the club, becoming the 1st Knight to do so.
Round 7: Dane Gagai scored his 100th career point.
Round 7: Kurt Gidley captained his 107th game for the club, breaking Andrew Johns' record of 106 games for most appearances as captain for the Knights.
Round 9: Joseph Leilua played his 50th game for the club.
Round 9: Tariq Sims scored his 1st try for the club.
Round 10: David Fa'alogo played his 50th game for the club.
Round 10: Chad Redman made his NRL debut for the club and scored his 1st career try.
Round 12: Chris Houston played his 150th game for the club.
Round 12: Sam Mataora made his debut for the club, after previously playing for the Canberra Raiders.
Round 12: Carlos Tuimavave made his debut for the club, after previously playing for the New Zealand Warriors.
Round 13: Joseph Leilua scored his 50th career try.
Round 15: Danny Levi made his NRL debut for the club.
Round 15: Carlos Tuimavave scored his 1st try for the club.
Round 16: Dane Gagai scored his 100th point for the club.
Round 16: Danny Levi scored his 1st career try.
Round 20: Jeremy Smith played his 50th game for the club.
Round 21: Lachlan Fitzgibbon made his NRL debut for the club.
Round 21: Nathan Ross made his NRL debut for the club and scored his 1st career try.
Round 21: Beau Scott played his 50th game for the club.
Round 22: Korbin Sims played his 50th game for the club, which was also his 50th career game.
Round 22: Joseph Tapine scored his 1st career try.
Round 24: Tyrone Roberts scored his 400th point for the club, which was also his 400th career point.
Round 25: Kurt Gidley played his 250th game for the club, which was also his 250th career game.
Round 25: Akuila Uate played his 150th game for the club, which was also his 150th career game.
Round 26: Beau Scott played his 200th career game.

Squad

Transfers and Re-signings

Gains

Losses

Promoted juniors

Change of role

Re-signings

Player contract situations

Ladder

Jerseys and sponsors
In 2015, the Knights' jerseys were made by ISC and their major sponsor was Newpave Asphalt.

Fixtures

Auckland Nines

Squad: 1. Sione Mata'utia 2. Jake Mamo 3. Dane Gagai 4. Chanel Mata'utia 5. Carlos Tuimavave 6. Jarrod Mullen (c) 7. Tyrone Roberts 8. Pat Mata'utia 9. Adam Clydsdale 10. Paterika Vaivai 11. Tyler Randell 12. Chris Houston 13. Robbie Rochow 14. Nathan Ross 15. Korbin Sims 16. Joseph Tapine 17. Jack Stockwell 18. Danny Levi

Pre-season trials

Regular season

Statistics

30 players used.

Source:

Representative honours

The following players appeared in a representative match in 2015.

Australian Schoolboys
Jayden Butterfield

Cook Islands
Sam Mataora

Fiji
Daniel Saifiti
Jacob Saifiti
Korbin Sims
Rick Stone (coach)

Indigenous All Stars
Dane Gagai
Tyrone Roberts

Junior Kiwis
Danny Levi

Lebanon
James Elias

New South Wales
Sione Mata'utia (squad member)
Beau Scott
Tariq Sims (18th man)

New South Wales Country
James McManus
Jarrod Mullen (squad member)
Tariq Sims
Kade Snowden
Akuila Uate

New South Wales Residents
Chanel Mata'utia
Nathan Ross (19th man)

New South Wales under-16s
Mat Croker

New South Wales under-18s
Jack Cogger (captain)
Brodie Jones
Brock Lamb

New South Wales under-20s
Luke Yates

NRL All Stars
Beau Scott (captain)
Jeremy Smith

Prime Minister's XIII
Dane Gagai
Jake Mamo (train-on squad)
Jack Stockwell (train-on squad)

Queensland
Dane Gagai
Korbin Sims (20th man)

Samoa
Joseph Leilua
Pat Mata'utia
Carlos Tuimavave

Individual honours

Teams and squads
National Youth Competition (NYC) Team of the Year
Danny Levi

New South Wales Cup Team of the Year
Kerrod Holland

New South Wales Under-20s Origin Pathways Camp
Bryce Donovan
Bradie Smith
Luke Yates

Queensland Academy of Sport Emerging Origin Squad
Dane Gagai
Korbin Sims

Newcastle Knights awards

Player of the Year
National Rugby League (NRL) Player of the Year: Kurt Gidley
New South Wales Cup Player of the Year: Lachlan Fitzgibbon
National Youth Competition (NYC) Player of the Year: Ken Tofilau

Players' Player
National Rugby League (NRL) Players' Player: Kade Snowden
New South Wales Cup Players' Player: Honeti Tuha
National Youth Competition (NYC) Players' Player: Fuaimamao Uta

Coach's Award
National Rugby League (NRL) Coach's Award: Dane Gagai
New South Wales Cup Coach's Award: Daniel Saifiti
National Youth Competition (NYC) Coach's Award: Kerrod Holland

Brian Carlson Club-Andrew Johns Medal
Tom Starling

References

Newcastle Knights seasons
Newcastle Knights season